Hugh Bayard Urban is a professor of religious studies at Ohio State Universities Department of Comparative Studies and author of eight books and several academic articles, including a history of the Church of Scientology, published by Princeton University Press in 2012.

Early life, education and family 
Urban is the son of a psychologist and Pennsylvania State University professor and was brought up in a devout Episcopal family, received his PhD in history of religions from the University of Chicago and is married to Ohio State University lecturer Nancy Jesser. They have one child.

Academic research
Urban's academic focus began with the religions of India and expanded to his studies of new religious movements in both the United States and Europe, with his stating that the knowledge and power used by religions to keep information hidden from others had always fascinated him and of which he has written many academic books and articles about.

Scientology scholarship
In 2006, Urban wrote an article for the Journal of the American Academy of Religion (published by Oxford University Press on behalf of the American Academy of Religion) titled "Fair Game: Secrecy, Security, and the Church of Scientology in Cold War America".

By 2011, Urban had expanded his research into the practices of the Church of Scientology, incorporating his information into a new book titled The Church of Scientology: A History of a New Religion (published by Princeton University Press) which received praise:
 Michael Shermer, founder of The Skeptics Society and a columnist for Scientific American, called Urban's book "the most scholarly treatment of the organization to date."
 Rachel Aviv of the London Review of Books said that Urban's book "chronicles the way Hubbard reacted to legal and political challenges to his authority by attempting (largely successfully) to conceal his theories from the public."
 Kirkus Reviews called the book "a fascinating and oftentimes mind-bending account of how penny-a-word sci-fi writer L. Ron Hubbard doggedly pursued the religion angle in his quest to create the worldwide Church of Scientology."

Urban also observed that Church of Scientology founder L. Ron Hubbard formed many of his theories from those previously written about by the early to mid 20th century astral projection pioneer Sylvan Muldoon in his (Muldoon's) 1951 book The Phenomena of Astral Projection co-written with Hereward Carrington.

Bibliography 
Songs of Ecstasy: Tantric and Devotional Songs from Bengal (2001) (New York: Oxford University Press)
The Economics of Ecstasy: Tantra, Secrecy and Power in Colonial Bengal (2001) (New York: Oxford University Press)
Tantra: Sex, Secrecy, Politics and Power in the Study of Religion (2003) (University of California Press)
Magia Sexualis: Sex, Magic and Liberation in Modern Western Esotericism (2006) (University of California Press)
The Secrets of the Kingdom: Religion and Concealment in the Bush Administration (2007) (Rowman & Littlefield)
The Power of Tantra: Religion, Sexuality and the Politics of South Asian Studies (2009) (I.B. Tauris/ Palgrave MacMillan)
The Church of Scientology: A History of a New Religion (2011) (Princeton University Press)

See also 
Scientology and other religions

References 

American religion academics
American spiritual writers
Living people
Ohio State University faculty
Researchers of new religious movements and cults
Year of birth missing (living people)